KaTeX is a cross-browser JavaScript library that displays mathematical notation in web browsers. It puts special emphasis on being fast and easy to use.

It was initially developed by Khan Academy, and became one of the top five trending projects on GitHub in September 2014.

Features
KaTeX rendering of math claims to be:
 Fast: It renders its math synchronously and doesn’t need to reflow the page.
 Print quality: Its layout is based on TeX.
 Self contained: It has no dependencies, so it can be easily bundled.
 Capable of server-side rendering: it has an option to generate HTML on the server (so, for example, one can pre-render expressions using Node.js and send them as plain HTML).
Compared to MathJax, it handles only a limited subset of LaTeX's mathematics notation.

See also 

 MathML

References

External links 
 
 "KaTeX is a (partial) alternative to (some of) MathJax"
 "KaTeX - a new way to display math on the Web"
 KaTeX-MathJax comparison

Free mathematics software
JavaScript libraries